Patrice Nzekou Nguenheu (born 22 June 1983 in Kumba, Southwest Province, Cameroon) is Cameroonian footballer who last played for Persiba Balikpapan in the Indonesia Super League.

Honours

Club honors
Cotonsport Garoua
Cameroonian Championship (2): 2005, 2006

References

External links 
 Profile at liga-indonesia.co.id

Living people
1983 births
Expatriate footballers in Indonesia
Cameroonian footballers
Liga 1 (Indonesia) players
Persebaya Surabaya players
PSPS Pekanbaru players
Persiba Balikpapan players
Cameroonian expatriate sportspeople in Turkey
Cameroonian expatriate sportspeople in Indonesia
Cameroonian expatriate footballers
Association football midfielders